Semisulcospira is a genus of freshwater snails with an operculum, an aquatic gastropod mollusks in the family Semisulcospiridae. 

Species in the genus Semisulcospira are viviparous.

Species 
Species within the genus Semisulcospira include:

 Semisulcospira arenicola Watanabe & Nishino, 1995
 Semisulcospira calculus (Reeve, 1859)
 Semisulcospira coreana (Martens, 1886)
 Semisulcospira crassicosta Y.-Y. Liu, Y.-X. Wang & Y.-H. Duan, 1994
 Semisulcospira davisi Sawada & Nakano, 2021
 Semisulcospira decipiens (Westerlund, 1883)
 Semisulcospira diminuta Gredler, 1887
 Semisulcospira dilatata Watanabe & Nishino, 1995
 † Semisulcospira fiscina (Yokoyama, 1932) 
 Semisulcospira fluvialis Watanabe & Nishino, 1995
 Semisulcospira forticosta (Martens, 1886)
 Semisulcospira fuscata Watanabe & Nishino, 1995
 † Semisulcospira gamoensis Matsuoka & Miura, 2019 
 Semisulcospira gottschei (Martens, 1886)
 Semisulcospira gredleri (Boettger, 1886)
 Semisulcospira habei Davis, 1969
 Semisulcospira habei yamaguchi Davis, 1969
 Semisulcospira hongkongensis Brot, 1874
 † Semisulcospira kokubuensis Matsuoka & Miura, 2018 
 Semisulcospira kurodai Kajiyama & Habe, 1961
 Semisulcospira libertina (Gould, 1859)
 Semisulcospira marica Y.-Y. Liu, Y.-X. Wang & W.-Z. Zhang, 1994
 Semisulcospira morii Watanabe, 1984
 Semisulcospira multigranosa (Boettger, 1886)
 † Semisulcospira nagiensis (Matsuoka & Taguchi, 2013) 
 † Semisulcospira nakamurai Matsuoka & Miura, 2018 
 Semisulcospira nakasekoae Kuroda, 1929
 Semisulcospira ningpoensis (I. Lea, 1857)
 Semisulcospira niponica (Smith, 1876)
 † Semisulcospira nojirina Matsuoka & Miura, 2019 
 Semisulcospira ourense Watanabe & Nishino, 1984
 Semisulcospira pacificans (Heude, 1888)
 Semisulcospira pleuroceroides (Bavay & Dautzenberg, 1910)
 † Semisulcospira praemultigranosa Matsuoka, 1985 
 † Semisulcospira pseudomultigranosa Matsuoka & Miura, 2018
 † Semisulcospira pusilla Matsuoka & Miura, 2018 
 Semisulcospira reiniana (Brot, 1876)
 Semisulcospira reticulata Kajiyama & Habe, 1961
 † Semisulcospira reticulataformis Matsuoka & Miura, 2019 
 Semisulcospira rugosa Watanabe & Nishino, 1995
 Semisulcospira shiraishiensis Watanabe & Nishino, 1995
 † Semisulcospira spinulifera Matsuoka & Miura, 2018 
 † Semisulcospira tagaensis Matsuoka & Miura, 2019 
 Semisulcospira takeshimensis Watanabe & Nishino, 1995
 Semisulcospira tegulata (Martens, 1894)
 Semisulcospira trachea (Westerlund, 1883)

"Semisulcospira libertina species complex" consist of four species: Semisulcospira libertina, Semisulcospira reiniana, Semisulcospira kurodai and Semisulcospira trachea.
Synonyms
 Semisulcospira dolichostoma Annandale, 1924: synonym of Koreoleptoxis dolichostoma (Annandale, 1924) (original combination)
 Semisulcospira inflata Tchang, 1949: synonym of Hua textrix (Heude, 1889) (junior synonym)
 Semisulcospira paludiformis Yen, 1939: synonym of Sulcospira paludiformis (Yen, 1939) (original combination)
 Semisulcospira paucicincta (E. von Martens, 1894): synonym of Semisulcospira calculus (Reeve, 1859) (junior synonym)
 † Semisulcospira recticancellata Kobayashi & Suzuki, 1939: synonym of † Pachychilus recticancellata (Kobayashi & Suzuki, 1939) 
 Semisulcospira trivolvis Yen, 1939: synonym of Sulcospira paludiformis (Yen, 1939) (possible synonym)

Ecology
Semisulcospira snails predate also on eggs of bluegill Lepomis macrochirus.

Uses

Semisulcospira snails are used in some forms of cuisine. In Korean cuisine, they are used to flavor a type of congee (juk), called olgaengi juk.

References 

 Yen, T.-C. (1939). Die chinesischen Land- und Süßwasser-Gastropoden des Natur-Museums Senckenberg. Abhandlungen der Senckenbergischen Naturforschenden Gesellschaft. 444: 1-233, pl. 1-16. Frankfurt am Main.
 Oniwa K. & Kimura M. (1986). "Genetic variability and relationships in six snail species of the genus Semisulcospira". The Japanese journal of genetics 61(5): 503-514. CiNii. 
 Wenz, W. (1938-1944). Gastropoda. Teil 1: Allgemeiner Teil und Prosobranchia. xii + 1639 pp. In: Schindewolf, O.H. (Ed.) Handbuch der Paläozoologie, Band 6. Bornträger, Berlin. Lief. 1, 1-240

External links 
 Search for Semisulcospira at CiNii
 Boettger, O. (1886). Zur Kenntniss der Melanien Chinas und Japans. Jahrbücher der Deutschen Malakozoologischen Gesellschaft. 13: 1-16
 Matsuoka, K. (1985). Pliocene freshwater gastropods from the Iga Formation of the Kobiwako Group, Mie Prefecture, Central Japan. Transactions and Proceedings of the Palaeontological Society of Japan, new series. 139: 180-195
 Abbott, R. T. (1948). Handbook of Medically Important Mollusks of the Orient and the Western Pacific. Bulletin of the Museum of Comparative Zoology at Harvard College. 100 (3): 245-328
 Du, L.-N. (Li-Na); Köhler, F.; Yu, G.-H. (Guo-Hua); Chen, X.-Y.(Xiao-Yong); Yang, J.-X. (Jun-Xing). (2019). Comparative morpho-anatomy and mitochondrial phylogeny of the Semisulcospiridae of Yunnan, southwestern China, with description of four new species (Gastropoda, Cerithioidea). Invertebrate systematics. 33: 825-848

Semisulcospiridae